Luarasi University is a university in Tirana, Albania. It offers degrees in Law, Economics,  Information Technology and Medical Sciences. It was founded in 2003 by decree of the Albanian government to license a private university.

See also
List of universities in Albania
List of colleges and universities
List of colleges and universities by country

External links and References
Official website 

Universities in Albania
Educational institutions established in 2003
Universities and colleges in Tirana
2003 establishments in Albania